William Watkins Pendleton, Sr. (born January 18, 1940) is a former Democratic member of the Pennsylvania House of Representatives.

References

Democratic Party members of the Pennsylvania House of Representatives
Living people
1940 births